There have been two Baronetcies created for persons with the surname Mitchell, one in the Baronetage of Great Britain and one in the Baronetage of the United Kingdom.

The Mitchell Baronetcy, of West Shore in Zetland, was created in the Baronetage of Great Britain on 19 June 1724 for John Mitchell. The title was generally thought to have become extinct or dormant on the death of the third Baronet in 1783. However, in 1895 James William Mitchell was served heir male by the Scottish Sheriff of Chancery and is considered by some sources as the 9th Baronet. He was a descendant of the seventh and youngest son of the first Baronet but never assumed the title and neither did his son Hugh Sykes Mitchell. The present status of the baronetcy is uncertain.

The Mitchell Baronetcy, of Tulliallan in the County of Fife and of Luscar in the Province of Alberta in the Dominion of Canada, was created in the Baronetage of the United Kingdom on 6 September 1945 for the Conservative politician Harold Mitchell. He was the son of the Scottish businessman Alexander Mitchell and the great-grandson of William Mitchell, founder of the Alloa Coal Company. The title became extinct on Mitchell's death in 1983. The Barons Selsdon are also descended from William Mitchell.

Mitchell baronets, of West Shore (1724)

Sir John Mitchell, 1st Baronet (died 1739)  
Sir Andrew Mitchell, 2nd Baronet (–1764)  
Sir John Mitchell, 3rd Baronet (1734–1783)
John Charles Mitchell, presumed 4th Baronet (1709–1790)
Edward Charles Mitchell, presumed 5th Baronet  (1749–1 Oct 1818)	
John Warburton Mitchell, presumed 6th Baronet  (1756–1831)		
Joseph Mitchell, presumed 7th Baronet  (1762–1833)		
Joseph Theophilus Mitchell, presumed 8th Baronet  (1793-1849)	
James William Mitchell, presumed 9th Baronet  (1836–1898) 	
Hugh Sykes Mitchell, presumed 10th Baronet  (1880–1???)

Mitchell baronets, of Tulliallan and Luscar (1945) 
Sir Harold Paton Mitchell, 1st Baronet (1900–1983)

References

Baronetcies in the Baronetage of Great Britain
Dormant baronetcies
Extinct baronetcies in the Baronetage of the United Kingdom